The badminton women's doubles tournament at the 2002 Asian Games in Busan took place from 11 November to 14 November at Gangseo Gymnasium.

13 teams from 8 nations entered for the tournament and the Korean duo of Ra Kyung-min and Lee Kyung-won won the gold in this tournament. with a two-set victory over China's Gao Ling and Huang Sui. Two other teams from China and South Korea shared the bronze medal.

Schedule
All times are Korea Standard Time (UTC+09:00)

Results

References
2002 Asian Games Official Report, Pages 268

External links
 2002 Asian Games Official Website

Women's doubles